The 2022–23 Svenska Cupen Damer is the 40th edition of the women's association football main cup competition in Sweden.

Format
44 teams from the Division 1 and below entered the first round. The winners will then join the Elitettan teams at the second round, while the Damallsvenskan teams join at the third round 

The qualification round starts from May and ends in February, after which the last 16 clubs would be grouped into 4 groups of 4 teams each.

Calendar
Below are the dates for each round as given by the official schedule:

Qualification round

First round 
44 teams from the Division 1 and lower entered this round via their districts qualifications. Matches are to be played between 4 May and 2 June 2022.

Matches

Second round 
The 22 winners from the first round plus the 14 Elitettan teams play in this round.

Matches

Third round 
The 18 winners from the second round plus the 14 Damallsvenskan teams play in this round.

Matches

Group stage

Group 1

Group 2

Group 3

Group 4

Statistics

Top scorers

References 

2022 in Swedish women's football
2022–23 domestic association football cups